Trina & Tamara are an American R&B duo from Gary, Indiana, who were active in the late 1990s. The group was composed of sisters Trina Powell (born April 18, 1974) and Tamara Powell. They are the younger sisters of fellow contemporary R&B singer Jesse Powell. In 1997, the duo appeared on the song "My Love Is the Shhh!" by Somethin' for the People, which peaked at number 4 on the Billboard Hot 100. Their next single, "What'd You Come Here For?" was released in 1999. It peaked at number 14 on the Billboard R&B chart, and number 56 on the Hot 100. Their album, the eponymous Trina & Tamara, was released shortly after and peaked at number 99 on the Billboard R&B albums chart.

In 2016, the sisters announced they were working on an autobiographical book titled The Sisterfriend Journey, which is based on their relationship (and many years of fallout) as sisters, songwriters, and women. It was released on March 15, 2017.

Discography

Albums

Singles

As featured artist

Bibliography
The Sisterfriend Journey (2017)

References

External links
 
 

American contemporary R&B musical groups
Columbia Records artists
Musical groups from Indiana
Contemporary R&B duos
Female musical duos
Sibling musical duos
Musicians from Gary, Indiana